Rui Manuel da Costa Varela (born 9 August 1983 in Alhos Vedros, Moita, Setúbal District) is a Portuguese former professional footballer who played as a forward.

References

External links

1983 births
Living people
People from Moita
Portuguese footballers
Association football forwards
Primeira Liga players
Liga Portugal 2 players
Segunda Divisão players
S.L. Benfica B players
Juventude Sport Clube players
Atlético Clube de Portugal players
F.C. Barreirense players
C.D. Olivais e Moscavide players
C.F. Estrela da Amadora players
S.C. Beira-Mar players
C.F. Os Belenenses players
C.D. Mafra players
GS Loures players
C.D. Cova da Piedade players
S.U. Sintrense players
U.D. Vilafranquense players
Sportspeople from Setúbal District